The telephone numbering plan of the USSR was a set of telephone area codes, numbers and dialing rules, which operated in the Soviet Union until the 1990s. After the collapse of the USSR, many newly independent republics implemented their own numbering plans. However, many of the principles of the Soviet numbering plan still remain. The former Soviet international code +7 is still retained by Russia and Kazakhstan.

Basic principles
The Soviet Union used a four-level open numbering plan. The long-distance prefix was 8.
 One could call a local number without the code. Local numbers usually consisted of 5-7 digits, with seven-digit numbers only occurring in Moscow (since 1968), Leningrad (since 1976) and Kiev (since 1981). If the internal number of the regional center had less than 7 digits, then its intercity code was supplemented with numbers (usually 2 for the administrative center, 6 for the second largest city).
 For example, with the code 423 of Primorsky Krai: 423 22 was the code of Vladivostok, while 423 66 was the code of Nakhodka.
 Within the same numbering area (most often within the state or region) the pattern was: 8 2X YYYYYY, where 2 replaced the three-digit area code.
 For example: 8 2 24 XXXXX for a call to the city of Klin, Klinsky District, Moscow Oblast from Moscow and the Moscow Oblast.
 For calls to other areas, one had to first dial long-distance prefix 8, then, after the tone, the full code of the numbering area, which consisted of a three-digit code and zone additional digit(X), and then the local phone number.
 For example: 8 096 24 XXXXX for a call to the city of Klin, Klinsky District, Moscow Oblast from other regions.
 For international calls, one should dial 8 10 [country code] [code] [phone number].
 For example: 8 10 1 212 XXXXXXX for a call to New York City.
 Also: 8 10 359 2 XXXXXX for a call to the city of Sofia.

Emergency and service numbers

Emergency numbers in the USSR began with 0 and had two digits. When one called the emergency numbers, no tariff was charged. (However, in Moscow in the late 1980s calling emergency services from a payphone was not free, despite the declared free-of-charge numbers.)

01 - Fire brigade
02 - Police
03 - Ambulance
04 - Gas leaks
05 was used in some major cities as a city certificate of addresses of residents or organizations
06 was used in many cities (and in some cases is still) for reception of telegrams through the home telephone
07 was used to order long-distance calls through the operator
08 was used and continues to be used to contact the telephone repair bureau
09 was a telephone directory service (search for a phone by the name of the organization or the subscriber).

In addition, in Moscow there was and continues to operate a toll-free telephone number 100 to get the current time. The free telephone service of the exact time is preserved in also other cities of Russia; for example in Kaliningrad this number is 060.

Country code separations
1993 -  (+372),  (+371),  (+370),  (+373)
1994 -  (+994),  (+995)
1995 -  (+374),  (+375),  (+380)
1997 -  (+996),  (+992), 
1998 -  (+993, June 12),  (+998, October 1)
2023 -  (+997)
None -  (+7)

Area codes
Basically, area codes were distributed geographically, so that neighboring regions usually had close area code numbers.

Area 0 
Area codes with 0 denotes the republics and Oblasts of the European part of the USSR. After the collapse of the Soviet Union, these codes in Russia, Belarus and Ukraine were preserved, with minor changes. Area codes in the Ukraine and Belarus later dropped initial 0. In Russia, in December 2005 the leading zero in the Oblastal area codes was replaced by a 4 with the next 2 numbers same (except Kaliningrad Oblast turning from 011 to 401 as 411 is in use).

 011 - Kaliningrad Oblast, Russian SFSR
 012 - Lithuania
 013 - Latvia
 014 - Estonia
 015 - Grodno Region, Byelorussia
 016 - Brest Oblast, Byelorussia
 017 - Minsk Oblast, Byelorussia
 021 - Vitebsk Oblast, Byelorussia
 022 - Mogilev Oblast, Byelorussia
 023 - Gomel Oblast, Byelorussia
 031 - Transcarpathian Oblast, Ukraine
 032 - Lviv Oblast, Ukraine
 033 - Volyn Oblast, Ukraine
 034 - Ivano-Frankivsk Oblast, Ukraine
 035 - Ternopil Oblast, Ukraine
 036 - Rivne Oblast, Ukraine
 037 - Chernivtsi Oblast, Ukraine
 038 - Khmelnytsky Oblast, Ukraine
 041 - Zhytomyr Oblast, Ukraine
 042 - Moldavia
 043 - Vinnytsia Oblast, Ukraine
 044 - Kiev and Kiev Oblast, Ukraine
 046 - Chernigov Oblast, Ukraine
 047 - Cherkasy Oblast, Ukraine
 048 - Odessa Oblast, Ukraine
 051 - Nikolaev Oblast, Ukraine
 052 - Kirovograd Oblast, Ukraine
 053 - Poltava Oblast, Ukraine
 054 - Sumy Oblast, Ukraine
 055 - Kherson Oblast, Ukraine
 056 - Dnepropetrovsk Oblast, Ukraine
 057 - Kharkov Oblast, Ukraine
 061 - Zaporozhye Oblast, Ukraine
 062 - Donetsk Oblast, Ukraine
 064 - Voroshilovgrad Oblast, Ukraine
 065 - Crimea Oblast, Ukraine
 069 - Sevastopol, Ukraine

 071 - Kursk Oblast, Russian SFSR
 072 - Belgorod Oblast, Russian SFSR
 073 - Voronezh Oblast, Russian SFSR
 074 - Lipetsk Oblast, Russian SFSR
 075 - Tambov Oblast, Russian SFSR
 081 - Smolensk Oblast, Russian SFSR
 082 - Kalinin Oblast, Russian SFSR
 083 - Bryansk Oblast, Russian SFSR
 084 - Kaluga Oblast, Russian SFSR
 085 - Yaroslavl Oblast, Russian SFSR
 086 - Orel Oblast, Russian SFSR
 087 - Tula Oblast, Russian SFSR
 091 - Ryazan Oblast, Russian SFSR
 092 - Vladimir Oblast, Russian SFSR
 093 - Ivanovo Oblast, Russian SFSR
 094 - Kostroma Oblast, Russian SFSR
 095 - Moscow (city), Russian SFSR
 096 - Moscow Oblast (without the suburbs of Moscow),  Russian SFSR
 097 - Governmental phone network in Moscow region (Iskra / Iskra-2)

Area 3 

 301 - Buryat ASSR, Russian SFSR
 302 - Chita Oblast, Russian SFSR
 310 - Zhezkazgan Oblast, Kazakhstan (now merged into Karagandy Region)
 311 - Ural Oblast (now West Kazakhstan), Kazakhstan
 312 - Gurievskaya Oblast, Kazakhstan
 313 - Aktobe Oblast, Kazakhstan
 314 - Kustanaiska Oblast, Kazakhstan
 315 - North Kazakhstan, Kazakhstan
 316 - Kokchetav Oblast, Kazakhstan (now split between North Kazakhstan and Akmola Region)
 317 - Tselinogradskaya Oblast (now for Nur-Sultan only), Kazakhstan
 318 - Pavlodar Oblast, Kazakhstan
 319 - Issyk-Kul Oblast, Kirghizia
 321 - Karaganda Oblast, Kazakhstan
 322 - Semipalatinsk Oblast, Kazakhstan (now merged into East Kazakhstan)
 323 - East Kazakhstan Oblast, Kazakhstan
 324 - Kyzyl-Orda Oblast, Kazakhstan
 325 - Shymkent Oblast, Kazakhstan
 326 - Dzhambulskaya Oblast, Kazakhstan
 327 - Alma-Ata Oblast, Kazakhstan
 328 - Taldykorgan Oblast, Kazakhstan (now merged into Almaty Region)
 329 - Mangistau Oblast, Kazakhstan
 330 - Turgay Oblast, Kazakhstan (now split between Kostanay and Akmola)
 331 - Chuy Oblast, Kirghizia
 332 - Osh Oblast, Kirghizia
 334 - Talas Region, Kirghizia
 335 - Naryn Region, Kirghizia
 336 22 - Baikonur, Kyzyl-Orda Oblast, Kazakhstan
 341 - Udmurt ASSR, Russian SFSR
 342 - Perm Oblast, Russian SFSR
 343 - Sverdlovsk Oblast, Russian SFSR
 345 - Tyumen Oblast, Russian SFSR

 347 - Bashkir ASSR, Russian SFSR
 351 - Chelyabinsk Oblast, Russian SFSR
 352 - Kurgan Oblast, Russian SFSR
 353 - Orenburg Oblast, Russian SFSR
 360 - Tashauz Oblast, Turkmenia
 361 - Karakalpakstan ASSR, Uzbekistan
 362 - Khorezm Oblast, Uzbekistan
 363 - Ashgabat Oblast, Turkmenia
 365 - Bukhara Oblast, Uzbekistan
 366 - Samarkand Oblast, Uzbekistan
 367 - Syrdarya Oblast, Uzbekistan
 369 - Namangan Oblast, Uzbekistan
 370 - Mary Oblast, Turkmenistan
 371 - Tashkent Oblast, Uzbekistan
 372 - Djizzak, Uzbekistan
 373 - Ferghana Oblast, Uzbekistan
 374 - Andijan, Uzbekistan
 375 - Kashkadarya, Uzbekistan
 376 - Surkhandarya, Uzbekistan
 377 - Districts of Republican Subordination, Kulob Oblast, Kurgan Oblast and Gorno-Badakhshan, Tajikistan
 378 - Charjev Oblast, Turkmenia
 379 - Sughd, Tajikistan
 381 - Omsk Oblast, Russian SFSR
 382 - Tomsk Oblast, Russian SFSR
 383 - Novosibirsk Oblast, Russian SFSR
 384 - Kemerovo Oblast, Russian SFSR
 385 - Altai Krai, Russian SFSR
 391 - Krasnoyarsk Territory, Russian SFSR
 394 - Tuvan ASSR, Russian SFSR
 395 - Irkutsk Oblast, Russian SFSR

Area 4 

 411 - Yakut ASSR, Russian SFSR
 413 - Magadan, Russian SFSR
 415 - Kamchatka, Russian SFSR
 416 - Amur Oblast, Russian SFSR
 421 - Khabarovsk Krai, Russian SFSR
 423 - Primorsky Krai, Russian SFSR
 424 - Sakhalin Oblast, Russian SFSR
 432 - Krasnovodskaya Oblast, Turkmenia
 436 - Navoiy Region, Uzbekistan

Area 8 

 811 - Pskov Oblast, Russian SFSR
 812 - Leningrad, Russian SFSR
 813 - Leningrad Oblast, Russian SFSR
 814 - Karelian ASSR, Russian SFSR
 815 - Murmansk, Russian SFSR
 816 - Novgorod Oblast, Russian SFSR
 817 - Vologda Oblast, Russian SFSR
 818 - Arkhangelsk Oblast, Russian SFSR
 821 - Komi ASSR, Russian SFSR
 831 - Gorky Oblast, Russian SFSR
 833 - Kirov Oblast, Russian SFSR
 834 - Mordovia ASSR, Russian SFSR
 835 - Chuvash ASSR, Russian SFSR
 836 - Mari ASSR, Russian SFSR
 841 - Penza Oblast, Russian SFSR
 842 - Ulyanovsk Oblast, Russian SFSR
 843 - Tatar ASSR, Russian SFSR
 844 - Volgograd Oblast, Russian SFSR
 845 - Saratov Oblast, Russian SFSR
 846 - Kuibyshev Oblast, Russian SFSR
 847 - Kalmyk ASSR, Russian SFSR

 851 - Astrakhan Oblast, Russian SFSR
 861 - Krasnodar, Russian SFSR
 862 2 - Sochi, Russian SFSR
 863 - Rostov Oblast, Russian SFSR
 865 - Stavropol Oblast, Russian SFSR
 866 - Kabardino-Balkar ASSR, Russian SFSR
 867 - North Ossetian ASSR, Russian SFSR
 871 - Chechen-Ingush Autonomous Soviet Socialist Republic, Russian SFSR
 872 - Dagestan ASSR, Russian SFSR
 882 - Adjara ASSR, Georgia
 883 - Other parts of Georgia and South Ossetian Autonomous Oblast
 885 - Armenia
 892 - Azerbaijan (East)
 895 - Azerbaijan (West)

See also
Telecommunications in Russia
Telephone numbers in Russia
Telephone numbers in the German Democratic Republic
Telephone numbers in Poland
Telephone numbers in Czechoslovakia (Czech Republic and Slovakia)
Telephone numbers in Hungary
Telephone numbers in Romania
Telephone numbers in Bulgaria
Telephone numbers in Cuba
Telephone numbers in Mongolia
Telephone numbers in Vietnam

References

Sources 
 РУКОВОДЯЩИЙ ДОКУМЕНТ ПО ОБЩЕГОСУДАРСТВЕННОЙ СИСТЕМЕ АВТОМАТИЗИРОВАННОЙ ТЕЛЕФОННОЙ СВЯЗИ (ОГСТфС) Книга I 
 https://web.archive.org/web/20120818213319/http://code.agava.ru/sngsity/sng01.htm
 https://web.archive.org/web/20100428003821/http://phonecodes.by.ru/01.html
 https://web.archive.org/web/20080625005301/http://www.scross.ru/guide/phone-local/

Telephone numbers
Communications in the Soviet Union
Soviet Union